San Juan Bajo is a station of the Seville Metro on line 1 named after its situation, in the low neighborhood of the municipality of San Juan de Aznalfarache, Seville. It is located in the outskirts of the city, close to A-49 road. San Juan Bajo is an elevated building, situated between San Juan Alto and Blas Infante stations on the same line. It was opened on April 2, 2009.

Connections
Bus: M-101, M-140, M-141, M-150, M-151, M-152, M-153, M-154A, M-154B, M-155

See also
 List of Seville metro stations

References

External links 
  Official site.
 History, construction details and maps.

Seville Metro stations
Railway stations in Spain opened in 2009